Hippomane horrida is a plant species in the Euphorbiaceae first described for science in 1929. It is endemic to Barahona Province in the Dominican Republic in the West Indies.

References

Hippomaneae
Endemic flora of the Dominican Republic
Plants described in 1929